In baseball statistics, an error is an act, in the judgment of the official scorer, of a fielder misplaying a ball in a manner that allows a batter or baserunner to advance one or more bases or allows an at bat to continue after the batter should have been put out. The center fielder (CF) is one of the three outfielders, the defensive positions in baseball farthest from the batter. Center field is the area of the outfield directly in front of a person standing at home plate and facing beyond the pitcher's mound. The outfielders' duty is to try to catch long fly balls before they hit the ground or to quickly catch or retrieve and return to the infield any other balls entering the outfield. Generally having the most territory to cover, the center fielder is usually the fastest of the three outfielders, although this can also depend on the relative strength of their throwing arms and the configuration of their home field, due to the deepest part of center field being the farthest point from the infield and home plate. The center fielder normally plays behind the shortstop and second baseman, who play in or near the infield; unlike catchers and most infielders (excepting first basemen), who are virtually exclusively right-handed, center fielders can be either right- or left-handed. In the scoring system used to record defensive plays, the center fielder is assigned the number 8.

The list of career leaders is dominated by players from the early 20th century; only three of the top 25 players were active after 1953. Only nine of the top 71 single-season totals were recorded after 1927, only one after 1939; only five of the top 183 totals were recorded after 1964. To a large extent, the leaders reflect longevity rather than lower skill. Tris Speaker, who holds the modern (post-1900) record of 227 errors committed as a center fielder, is often regarded as the greatest outfielder in history, setting records for putouts and assists; Willie Mays, whose 139 errors are the most by a center fielder since 1930, won twelve Gold Glove Awards for defensive excellence.

Because game accounts and box scores often did not distinguish between the outfield positions, there has been some difficulty in determining precise defensive statistics prior to 1901; because of this, and because of the similarity in their roles, defensive statistics for the three positions are frequently combined. Although efforts to distinguish between the three positions regarding games played during this period and reconstruct the separate totals have been largely successful, separate error totals are unavailable; players whose totals are missing the figures for pre-1901 games are notated in the table below. Tris Speaker is the post-1900 leader in career errors committed as a center fielder with 227; Ty Cobb (208) is second, and is the only other center fielder to commit over 200 career errors. Lorenzo Cain, who had 39 errors through the 2022 season to place him tied for 130th all-time, is the leader among active players.

Key

List

Other Hall of Famers

References

Baseball-Reference.com

Major League Baseball statistics
Major League Baseball lists